The Weybourne Crag Formation is a geologic formation in England. It preserves fossils.

See also

 List of fossiliferous stratigraphic units in England

References
 

Geology of England